Keyla Monterroso Mejia is an American actress and comedian known for playing Maria Sofia Estrada on Season 11 of HBO's sitcom series Curb Your Enthusiasm and Ashley Garcia in the second season of Abbott Elementary. 
She was born in Hawthorne, California, in Los Angeles County in 1998. Curb was her first major role, but she has had minor roles in other TV shows.

Mejia is a first generation-American of Guatemalan and Mexican descent. She grew up in the Inland Empire region of California.

Mejia played Val in Ann Marie Pace's 2021 short film Growing Fangs, one of a series of productions featured as part of the Disney+ Launchpad series. The same year, she made her television debut as a guest star on season 11 of Curb Your Enthusiasm, playing short order cook turned terrible actress Maria Sofia Estrada. Originally cast for one episode, she went on to appear in six of the season's ten episodes. 

In 2021, Mejia also starred in the final episode of On My Block. It was later announced she would appear in the spinoff series, Freeridge, alongside Bryana Salaz, Ciara Riley Wilson, and Tenzing Norway Trainor.

Filmography

Film

Television

References

External links

21st-century American actresses
American actresses of Mexican descent
American television actresses
Living people
1998 births